Sir Robert Pattinson Academy (formerly Robert Pattinson School) is a secondary school on the northeast side of Moor Lane in North Hykeham, Lincolnshire, England. Also known as RP, Lincoln City used the field as temporary training grounds. The Academy has approximately 1,450 students and is a Language College specialist school.

History
The school was opened in 1953 as the Robert Pattinson School. Sir Robert Pattinson was the Chairman of Kesteven County Council for 20 years, and for 50 years a County Councillor. He was Liberal MP for Grantham 1922–23. He was knighted in 1934, the year he became leader of Kesteven County Council.

The school was a 'bilateral' school (part grammar/part secondary modern) until January 1961 when the grammar school students transferred to the newly opened North Kesteven Grammar School. It became a comprehensive when parts of northern Kesteven became comprehensive in September 1970. This was four years before Lincoln went comprehensive – Lincoln was a separate county borough until April 1974.

It became a grant-maintained school self-governing in 1992, transferring to Foundation status in 1999. On 1 August 2011 the school became an Academy and changed its name to Sir Robert Pattinson Academy.

Timeline 
 1992 – became a self-governing school with grant-maintained status
 1994 – new science block opened by Sir Henry Nevile, Lord Lieutenant of Lincolnshire
 2000 – become a Beacon School
 2001 – appointed as a specialist school for languages
 2002 – language site opened by Anne, Princess Royal on 18 April
 2003 – achievement award for examination performance. Listed as an effective school by Ofsted
 2004 – John Alexander Music Suite opened, after a donation of £125,000
 2005 – new technology suite opened by Stewart Pattinson, grandson of Sir Robert Pattinson. Recognised as a high-performing specialist school by the Department for Education and Skills
 2006 – appointed as a Languages and Science College
 2011 – granted academy status. Name change to Sir Robert Pattinson Academy
 2016 - new drama studio opened
 2018 - new library and refurbished classrooms opened
 2018 - new head teacher appointed

Army Cadet Force and Air Training Corps
The Band Det (F) detachment of the Army Cadet Force is sited on the school. It was formed by the Nottingham-based East Midlands Reserve Forces. The cadet building was built in October 2010, and is used by the Regimental Band of the Lincolnshire Army Cadet Force.1237 Squadron (North Hykeham) ATC are also based there and the two cadet forces work together to ensure a positive image of young people in the community.

Academic performance
In the 1990s the school received GCSE results 3% higher than the Lincolnshire average. The school receives average GCSE results in Lincolnshire and England. At A level, the North Hykeham Joint Sixth Form is slightly over the English average.

Notable former pupils 
 Lindsay Coulson – bassist (King King)
 Paul Mayo – footballer
 Nigel Huddleston – Conservative Party Member of Parliament (MP) for the Mid Worcestershire.
 Sophie Wells - Paralympic gold medalist

References

External links 
 
 EduBase
 Former school at EduBase
 North Hykeham Joint Sixth Form at EduBase
 NHJSF
 Lincoln Specialist Schools

North Kesteven District
Educational institutions established in 1953
Secondary schools in Lincolnshire
1953 establishments in England
Academies in Lincolnshire